Berlin Syndrome is a 2017 psychological horror thriller film directed by Cate Shortland from a screenplay by Shaun Grant, based on the 2012 novel of the same name by Melanie Joosten. The film follows a young Australian photographer (Teresa Palmer) who travels to Germany, where she meets an attractive young English teacher (Max Riemelt). Waking up after a stormy night of passion with him, the photographer is suddenly taken hostage by her would-be lover.

Berlin Syndrome had its world premiere at the Sundance Film Festival on 20 January 2017 and was released in Australia on 20 April 2017 by Entertainment One. The film received very positive reviews from critics, with many praising the atmosphere, and the performances of Palmer and Riemelt.

Plot
In Berlin, Australian backpacker and photographer Clare meets local English teacher Andi. They spend the day together, then have sex in Andi's apartment. The following morning, Clare finds herself locked in. Upon Andi's return, he says he forgot to leave a key, and she spends another night after they go out dancing.

The next day, Clare finds he has written  (German for 'mine') on her shoulder and taken the SIM card from her phone. Attempting to smash her way out the windows, she finds they are double-paned and reinforced with plexiglass. It dawns on her that the other apartments in the building are abandoned. When Andi returns, Clare begs him to let her go but he begins restraining her to the bed while he is at work, leaving her to soil herself.

At dinner with his father, Erich, Andi tells him he is dating Clare. Erich asks what happened to his previous girlfriend Natalie, and Andi says she returned to Canada. That night, Andi lets Clare shower and she finds a clump of long blonde hair in the drain. Andi texts Clare's mother posing as her, informing her she is well.

Clare finds a screwdriver under the sofa and, when Andi comes home, she stabs him in the hand and flees the apartment. Andi catches her in the courtyard downstairs, breaking her fingers and bringing her back inside. Andi's student Franka shows up and flirts with him, but when she briefly spots Clare, Andi says she is his girlfriend and threatens to report her behaviour, causing her to leave.

Andi's bizarre behaviour continues, including taking pictures of Clare in disturbing positions, cutting off pieces of her hair, and retreating to a locked room. Depressed on finding his father has died, he spends a week at his father's house, leaving Clare in the apartment with the power off. When he returns, she comforts him and they have sex. As the holidays approach, Clare's mood seems to brighten; she learns to play the accordion and bakes treats for Andi. He gifts her his father's dog, but days later becomes jealous of their bond and kills him.

Andi takes Clare outside for the first time in months, to a forest where he plans to kill her with an axe. They are interrupted by two young boys, one of whom has injured his leg. Clare quietly begs the other to get help but he doesn't understand English. On New Year's Eve, Andi attends a work party and Clare breaks into the locked room and finds photo albums of a blonde woman. A man outside shines a flashlight at the windows; she screams for help and he attempts to rescue her, but Andi returns and kills him with a crowbar. Andi has Clare help him wrap the body in plastic, saying it's her fault he is dead. He burns the body in a dumpster in the courtyard.

More time passes and Clare apparently enjoys life with Andi. When she sees him grading student's workbooks, she hides a photograph in Franka's. Franka finds the picture of Clare bound and gagged. She flees the room and drops the picture, which is passed around by the other students. When Andi realises what is happening, he leaves the school in a panic. He arrives home to find the courtyard door open and the locked box of Clare's possessions open and empty. Franka has ridden her bike to the apartment and found Clare just before Andi arrives. Clare lures Andi in, hiding on the floor above his apartment. When he goes into the apartment, she calls his name and, before he can react, she locks him inside. Clare rescues Franka from upstairs.

Clare rides free in a cab through Berlin's streets.

Cast

Production

The film is based on the novel of the same name by Melanie Joosten, and the title is a reference to Stockholm syndrome. According to director Cate Shortland, the character of Andi had romanticised and idealised the East Germany of his childhood, and wanted to recreate a utopia in his own life.

In May 2015, Teresa Palmer and Max Riemelt joined the cast. Riemelt was chosen from a shortlist of 10 male actors.

Filming
Production began in September 2015 in Berlin. For two weeks prior to filming, Palmer and Riemelt stayed together in a small apartment similar to the one on the set.

In November 2015, filming moved to Docklands Studios Melbourne in Australia.

Release
The film had its world premiere at the Sundance Film Festival on 20 January 2017. Prior to Entertainment One, Curzon Artificial Eye, Vertical Entertainment and Netflix acquired Australian, United Kingdom, and United States distribution rights, respectively. It was released in Australia on 20 April, in the United States on 26 May, and in the United Kingdom on 9 June 2017.

Reception

Box office
Berlin Syndrome has grossed $28,660 in the United States and Canada, and $759,531 in other territories, for a total worldwide gross of $788,191. Sales of its DVD/Blu-ray releases have cashed $22,663.

Critical response
Berlin Syndrome was met with positive reviews. On review aggregator Rotten Tomatoes, the film holds an approval rating of 76% based on 90 reviews, and an average rating of 6.5/10. The website's critical consensus reads, "Berlin Syndrome offers thriller fans an uncommonly well-written descent into dangerous obsession, enlivened by taut direction and a committed performance from Teresa Palmer." On Metacritic, the film has a weighted average score of 70 out of 100, based on 17 critics, indicating "generally favorable reviews".

Accolades

References

External links

 
 

2017 films
2017 horror thriller films
2017 independent films
2017 multilingual films
2017 psychological thriller films
2010s English-language films
2010s German-language films
2010s psychological horror films
Australian horror thriller films
Australian multilingual films
Casual sex in films
English-language French films
Entertainment One films
Films about journalists
Films about kidnapping
Films about vacationing
Films based on Australian novels
Films directed by Cate Shortland
Films set in apartment buildings
Films set in Berlin
French horror thriller films
French multilingual films
French psychological horror films
French psychological thriller films
2010s French films